Sidney Perham (March 27, 1819 – April 9, 1907) was a U.S. Representative and the 33rd Governor of Maine and was an activist in the temperance movement.

Biography
Born in Woodstock (in modern-day Maine, then a part of Massachusetts) to Joel and Sophronia Bisbee Perham, Perham attended common schools as a child, engaged in agricultural pursuits and briefly attended Bates College, but left to pursue a passion for agriculture. He was elected a member of the Maine Board of Agriculture in 1853, was a member of the Maine House of Representatives in 1854, serving as Speaker of the House that one year, and was clerk of the courts of Oxford County, Maine, from 1859 to 1863. He was elected a Republican to the United States House of Representatives in 1862, serving from 1863 to 1869, not being a candidate for renomination in 1868. There, Perham served as chairman of the Committee on Invalid Pensions from 1865 to 1869. He served as president of the board of trustees of Westbrook Seminary in Deering, Maine, from 1865 to 1880. In September 1870, Perham was elected Governor of Maine, serving from 1871 to 1874. He replaced former American Civil War General Joshua Chamberlain as governor. He was president of the board of trustees of Maine Industrial School in Hallowell, Maine, from 1873 to 1898 and was Secretary of State of Maine in 1875. Perham served as a fellow at Bates College from 1871 to 1873.  Perham served as appraiser in the United States Customhouse in Portland, Maine, from 1877 to 1885 and was a member of the board of trustees of the Universalist General Convention for twenty-seven years, serving as its president for some time. He died in Washington, D.C., on April 9, 1907 and was interred in Lakeside Cemetery in Bryant Pond, Maine.

References and external links 

Biography of Sidney Perham
 Hon. Sidney Perham Representative men of Maine. A collection of portraits with biographical sketches of residents of the state, who have achieved success ... to which is added the portraits and sketches of all the governors since the formation of the state ... Prepared under the direction of Henry Chase. Portland, Me., The Lakeside press, 1893.

References

1819 births
1907 deaths
Republican Party members of the Maine House of Representatives
Republican Party governors of Maine
Secretaries of State of Maine
American temperance activists
People from Woodstock, Maine
Politicians from Portland, Maine
People of Maine in the American Civil War
Members of the Universalist Church of America
Westbrook College
19th-century Christian universalists
20th-century Christian universalists
Republican Party members of the United States House of Representatives from Maine
19th-century American politicians